Odd Ragnvald Todnem (14 October 1922 – 1 July 2012) was a Norwegian engineer.

He was born in Sandnes. He graduated from the Norwegian Institute of Technology in Trondheim in 1951, but also worked at the Norwegian College of Agriculture at Ås from 1949 to 1957. After three years as a research fellow from 1957 to 1960, he took the dr.ing. degree in 1961. He was a docent in electric power engineering at the Norwegian Institute of Technology, and professor from 1973 to 1993. He died in 2012.

References

1922 births
2012 deaths
People from Sandnes
Norwegian electrical engineers
Norwegian Institute of Technology alumni
Academic staff of the Norwegian College of Agriculture
Academic staff of the Norwegian Institute of Technology
Members of the Norwegian Academy of Technological Sciences